Diego Miguel Corvalan Couceiro (born 17 February 2002) is a Swiss professional footballer who plays as a right-back for YF Juventus.

Career statistics

Club

Notes

References

2002 births
Footballers from Zürich
Swiss people of Argentine descent
Sportspeople of Argentine descent
Living people
Swiss men's footballers
Switzerland youth international footballers
Association football defenders
FC Zürich players
SC Young Fellows Juventus players
FC Baden players
Swiss Super League players
Swiss Promotion League players